William Benn ( 1682 – 1755) was a British merchant, who was Lord Mayor of London in 1746.

Benn was a member of the Fletchers Company. He was a commom councilor of the City of London for Bishopsgate from 1730 to 1740 and was Auditor from 1739 to 1741. He was elected Alderman of Aldersgate Ward on 12 November 1740. In 1742 he was Sheriff of London. He became Lord Mayor of London for the year 1746 to 1747.

Benn was a Jacobite, and he sent a message of support to Charles Stuart while Lord Mayor. He was President of Bridewell and Bethlehem Hospitals from 1746 to 1755. In 1749 he was involved in a drunken fight with another Alderman at a London City feast after proposing a toast to the health of the Young Pretender. He was the originator of the so-called 'Benn's Club', consisting of himself and five other aldermen who were all Tories with Jacobite sympathies. The other five were Sir Henry Marshall (Lord Mayor 1744-5) John Blachford (Lord Mayor 1750), Robert Alsop  (Lord Mayor 1752), Edward Ironside (Lord Mayor 1753) and Sir Thomas Rawlinson (Lord Mayor 1753-4). In 1753 he stood in for Edmund Ironside who was indisposed on the day of his inauguration, and  rode in the State Coach and performed the honours of the day in his place.

Benn died, aged 73 years, on 10 August 1755 and was buried at St Mary the Virgin Churchyard Braughing, Hertfordshire.  His wife Mary died in 1773

External links
  Benn's Club  Six london Aldermen drinking the health of Prince Charles Edward Stuart, 1746.

References

1680s births
1755 deaths
Bankers from London
18th-century lord mayors of London
Year of birth uncertain